This page documents all tornadoes confirmed by various weather forecast offices of the National Weather Service in the United States during August to October 2018. Tornado counts are considered preliminary until final publication in the database of the National Centers for Environmental Information.

United States yearly total

August

August 1 event

August 2 event

August 3 event

August 4 event

August 5 event

August 6 event

August 7 event

August 8 event

August 9 event

August 11 event

August 14 event

August 15 event

August 16 event

August 17 event

August 18 event

August 19 event

August 20 event

August 21 event

August 23 event

August 26 event

August 27 event

August 28 event

September

September 1 event

September 2 event

September 3 event

September 4 event

September 5 event
Event was associated with Tropical Storm Gordon.

September 6 event
Event was associated with Tropical Storm Gordon.

September 8 event
Events were associated with Tropical Storm Gordon.

September 9 event

September 13 event
Events were associated with Hurricane Florence.

September 14 event
Events were associated with Hurricane Florence.

September 15 event
Events were associated with Hurricane Florence.

September 16 event
Events were associated with Hurricane Florence.

September 17 event
Events were associated with Hurricane Florence.

September 19 event

September 20 event

September 21 event

September 24 event

September 25 event

September 26 event

October

October 2 event

October 3 event

October 7 event

October 8 event

October 9 event

October 10 event
Events were associated with Hurricane Michael.

October 11 event
Events were associated with Hurricane Michael.

October 13 event
Events were associated with the remnants of Hurricane Sergio.

October 20 event

October 21 event

October 23 event

October 28 event

October 29 event

October 31 event

See also
 Tornadoes of 2018
 List of United States tornadoes from June to July 2018
 List of United States tornadoes from November to December 2018

Notes

References

2018 natural disasters in the United States
2018-related lists
Tornadoes of 2018
Tornadoes
2018, 08